Kojoor River is a river of Mazandaran Province in northern Iran.

It flows through the Central Alborz mountain range to the Caspian Sea.

See also
 Kojur village

Rivers of Mazandaran Province
Tributaries of the Caspian Sea
Alborz (mountain range)
Rivers of Iran